Mollalar-e Mohammadreza Kandi (also Romanized as Mollālār-e Moḩammadreẕā Kandī; also known as Mollālar) is a village in Goyjah Bel Rural District, in the Central District of Ahar County, East Azerbaijan Province, Iran. At the 2006 census, its population was 27, in 4 families.

References 

Populated places in Ahar County